In physics, the poppy-seed bagel theorem concerns interacting particles (e.g., electrons) confined to a bounded surface (or body)  when the particles repel each other pairwise with a magnitude that is proportional to the inverse distance between them raised to some positive power . In particular, this includes the Coulomb law observed in Electrostatics and Riesz potentials extensively studied in Potential theory. For  such particles, a stable equilibrium state, which depends on the parameter , is attained when the associated potential energy of the system is minimal (the so-called generalized Thomson problem). The poppy-seed bagel theorem asserts that for a large class of sets , the uniformity property holds when the parameter  is larger than or equal to the dimension of the set . For example, when the points ("poppy seeds") are confined to the 2-dimensional surface of a torus embedded in 3 dimensions (or "surface of a bagel"), one can create a large number of points that are nearly uniformly spread on the surface by imposing a repulsion proportional to the inverse square distance between the points, or any stronger repulsion. From a culinary perspective, to create the nearly perfect poppy-seed bagel where bites of equal size anywhere on the bagel would contain essentially the same number of poppy seeds, impose at least an inverse square distance repelling force on the seeds.

Formal definitions

For a compact set  we define its minimal -point -energy as 

Configurations  that attain this infimum are called -point -equilibrium configurations.

Poppy-seed bagel theorem for bodies
For every  fix an -point -equilibrium configuration . Set

where  is a unit point mass at point . Under these assumptions, in the sense of weak convergence of measures,

Furthermore, it is true that

where the constant  does not depend on the set  and, therefore,

Poppy-seed bagel theorem for manifolds

We assume . Assume 
As before, for every  fix an -point -equilibrium configuration  and set

Then, in the sense of weak convergence of measures,

where . If  is the -dimensional Hausdorff measure, then

where  is the volume of a d-ball.

The constant Cs,p
For , it is known that , where  is the Riemann zeta function. The following connection between the constant  and the problem of Sphere packing is known:

where  is the volume of a p-ball and 
 where the supremum is taken over all families  of non-overlapping unit balls such that the limit

exists.

See also 
 Hausdorff dimension
 Geometric measure theory
 Sphere packing
 Riemann zeta function

References 

Physics theorems
Potentials
Dimension
Bagels
Poppy seeds